Daniel Andreas Neofetou (born 1 February 1989) is a British writer and theorist. He is the author of the books Good Day Today: David Lynch Destabilises the Spectator (2012) and Rereading Abstract Expressionism, Clement Greenberg and the Cold War (2021). He is a regular contributor to The Wire and Art Monthly, and has written for Artforum, Mute, Complex, Flash Art and Le Phare, the journal of Le Centre culturel suisse. He has also published academic journal articles in Journal of Contemporary Painting, Quarterly Review of Film and Video, Arts, Getty Research Journal and Philosophy & Social Criticism."Laughing and Crying and Dancing: The Limits of Human Behavior in Swing Time (1936)". Taylor & Francis online, 30 January 2014. Retrieved 25 July 2020 He is an associate lecturer at University of Northampton and Birkbeck, and a visiting lecturer at University of Edinburgh.

Early life
Neofetou was born in Leamington Spa, England on 1 February 1989. He studied at University of Warwick, University of Edinburgh and Goldsmiths, University of London, at which he completed a PhD entitled Eyes in the Heat: The Question Concerning Abstract Expressionism, initially under the supervision of Mark Fisher, and subsequently under the supervision of Josephine Berry and Marina Vishmidt.

Career
His first book, a monograph on David Lynch entitled Good Day Today: David Lynch Destabilises the Spectator (2012), was published by Zero Books. In 2018, he curated Divine Cargo, an evening of performance art at South London Gallery. In 2018, he contributed to ‘The Annotated Reader’, a publication and exhibition curated by Ryan Gander. In early 2019, he contributed a short essay to the King's College London project "Technologically Fabricated Intimacy."

His second book, Rereading Abstract Expressionism, Clement Greenberg and the Cold War was published in October 2021 with Bloomsbury Publishing. In a review in Leonardo, Jan Baetens writes that it is 'an important contribution to the study of abstract expressionism' which provides 'very stimulating new interpretations of the discourses that have “made” abstract expressionism what it was.'

Bibliography

Books
 Rereading Abstract Expressionism, Clement Greenberg and the Cold War. Bloomsbury Visual Arts, 2021. 
 Good Day Today: David Lynch Destabilises the Spectator. Zero Books, 2012.

Scholarly articles

 'The Flesh of Negation: Adorno and Merleau-Ponty contra Heidegger,' Philosophy & Social Criticism, January 2022, https://doi.org/10.1177/01914537211066852
 'Greenberg's Marxism: Clement Greenberg's Unfinished Essay Draft on André Breton's "Political Position of Surrealism" (1935),' Getty Research Journal, 2021, 14:, 205–219, https://doi.org/10.1086/716587
 ‘Political Art Criticism and the Need for Theory,’ Arts, 2021, 10(1), 1; https://doi.org/10.3390/arts10010001
 ‘Laughing and Crying and Dancing: The Limits of Human Behaviour in Swing Time’, Quarterly Review of Film and Video, 38:6, pp. 541–558, https://doi.org/10.1080/10509208.2020.1780901
 ‘A world for us: On the prefiguration of reconciliation in Barnett Newman’s painting,’ Journal of Contemporary Painting, 2019, 5:1, pp. 147–61, https://doi.org/10.1386/jcp.5.1.147_1

References

External links
Daniel Neofetou at The Wire

1989 births
Living people
The Wire (magazine) writers
People from Leamington Spa